Toreulia runtunana is a species of moth of the family Tortricidae. It is found in Tungurahua Province, Ecuador.

The wingspan is about 28.5 mm.  The ground colour of the forewings is brown with two white lines. The hindwings are pale brownish cream, tinged with brownish grey strigulation (fine streaks) and suffusions in the distal half.

Etymology
The species name refers to Runtun, the type locality.

References

Moths described in 2007
Euliini